G. Srinivasan (23 September 1958 in Chennai, Tamil Nadu – 27 May 2007) was an Indian film producer who founded the independent production company, Madras Talkies, with his elder brother, director and screenwriter, Mani Ratnam.

He produced acclaimed films such as Iruvar (1997), Kannathil Muthamittal (2002), Aayitha Ezhuthu (2004), Yuva (2004) and Guru (2007), which was nominated for Apsara award and Popular award in 2008.
He was a practising Chartered Accountant.

Personal life
He was the brother of film director Mani Ratnam and film producer G Venkateswaran. He is survived by his daughters - Shreya  and twins Divya and Akshaya and wife Sandhya.

Death
Srinivasan died in an accident while he was trekking in a tourist resort in Manali along with his wife and elder daughter on Sunday, 27 May 2007. Srinivasan slipped and fell into a 100-foot-deep gorge.

References

External links 
 

1958 births
Tamil film producers
Accidental deaths from falls
Accidental deaths in India
2007 deaths
Film producers from Chennai
20th-century Indian businesspeople